Meleana Brown (born September 11, 1988), who goes by the stage name Meleana, is an American Christian musician. She started her music career, in 2003, with appearing on American Idol during season 3, where she was eliminated during Hollywood Week. Her next appearance was on the only season of Duets. Brown signed with Dream Records, where they released her first studio album, White Walls (2016).

Early life
Brown was born, Meleana Brown, on September 11, 1988, in Honolulu, Hawaii, where she was raised their and in Japan, when her family relocated for a while. Her cousin is Nicole Scherzinger. Her ethnicity is Hawaiian, Filipino, African-American, Spanish and Portuguese.

Music career
Her music career started in 2003, with her appearance on American Idol during season 3, where she was eliminated during the Hollywood Week of the competition. She appeared on the only season of Duets, performing with John Legend. Meleana was signed to Dream Records, where they released her first studio album, White Walls, on November 18, 2016.

Discography
White Walls (November 18, 2016, Dream)

References

External links

1984 births
Living people
American gospel singers
American Idol participants
African-American women songwriters
African-American Christians
Musicians from Honolulu
Songwriters from Hawaii
Songwriters from California
21st-century African-American women singers